Wine Cinema Train is a South Korean tourist train operated by Korail.

Operations
Started running: December 1, 2006
Services: Gyeongbu Line
Stations: Seoul Station - Yeongdong station

References

Passenger trains of the Korail
Tourist trains in South Korea
Railway services introduced in 2006